Ava Guarani may be,
the Ava Guarani people
the Ava Guarani language